The gray checkered whiptail (Aspidoscelis dixoni), also known commonly as Dixon's whiptail and the gray-checkered whiptail, is a species of lizard in the family Teiidae. The species is native to northern Mexico, and to the United States in southern New Mexico and western Texas.

Taxonomy
Some sources consider the gray checkered whiptail to be a subspecies of the common checkered whiptail, Aspidoscelis tesselatus, whereas others grant it full species status. It is one of many lizard species known to be parthenogenetic.

Etymology
The epithet, dixoni, is in homage of renowned American herpetologist James R. Dixon,

Description
It is typically gray in color, with 10–12 white or yellow stripes that go the length of the body, often with spotting or checkering on the stripes. It is thin-bodied, with a long tail.

Behavior and diet
Like most whiptail lizards, the gray checkered whiptail is diurnal and insectivorous. It is wary, energetic, and fast moving, darting for cover if approached.

Habitat
The preferred habitat of A. dixoni is rocky, semi-arid areas with sparse vegetation.

Reproduction
A. dixoni is parthenogenic, females lay unfertilized eggs in the mid-summer, which hatch in approximately six weeks.

References

External links
Herps of Texas: Cnemidophorus dixoni

Further reading
Reeder, Tod W; Cole, Charles J.; Dessauer, Herbert C. (2002). "Phylogenetic Relationships of Whiptail Lizards of the Genus Cnemidophorus (Squamata: Teiidae): A Test of Monophyly, Reevaluation of Karyotypic Evolution, and Review of Hybrid Origins". American Museum Novitates (3365): 1-64. (Aspidoscelis dixoni, new combination, p. 22).
Scudday, James F. (1973). "A New Species of Lizard of the Cnemidophorus tesselatus Group from Texas". Journal of Herpetology 7 (4): 363-371. (Cnemidophorus dixoni, new species).
Smith, Hobart M.; Brodie, Edmund D., Jr. (1982). Reptiles of North America: A Guide to Field Identification. New York: Golden Press. 240 pp.   (paperback),  (hardcover). (Cnemidophorus dixoni, p. 100).

Aspidoscelis
Fauna of the Southwestern United States
Reptiles of the United States
Reptiles of Mexico
Gray checkered whiptail
Gray checkered whiptail
Taxobox binomials not recognized by IUCN